The Beneteau First Class 10 is a French sailboat that was designed by Jean Marie Finot of Groupe Finot and Jacques Fauroux as a racer/cruiser and first built in 1982.

Production
The design was built by Beneteau in France between 1982 and 1987, with a total of 114 boats completed, but it is now out of production.

Design

The Beneteau First Class 10 is a recreational keelboat, built predominantly of solid fiberglass, with the deck made from balsa-cored fiberglass, with teak wooden trim. It has a 7/8 fractional sloop rig, with a double-spreader mast made by Z-Spar of France and stainless steel wire rigging. The hull has a raked stem, a walk-through reverse transom, an internally mounted spade-type rudder controlled by a tiller and a fixed fin keel. It displaces  and carries  of ballast.

The engine is mounted amidships, just above the keel and drives a folding propeller that is just aft of the keel.

The design has sleeping accommodation for six people, with a double "V"-berth in the bow cabin, an "L"-shaped settee and a straight settee in the main cabin and an aft cabin with a double berth on the starboard side. The galley is located on the port side just forward of the companionway ladder. The galley is "L"-shaped and is equipped with a two-burner, alcohol-fired stove and a single sink. A navigation station is opposite the galley, on the starboard side. The head is located just aft of the bow berth, within that cabin and has no sink. The main cabin has a double drop-leaf table. The cabin has a teak veneer headliner and teak bulkheads with a cabin sole of teak and holly. The interior walls are covered in cream-colored, foam-backed vinyl or a material made from pile fabric.

For sailing the boat is equipped with a double groove headstay, adjustable jib fairleads and adjustable running backstays that lead to self-tailing winches, The mainsail has a mid-cockpit mainsheet traveler, with a secondary block for fine-tuning.

Operational history
A review in the July 1982 issue of Canadian Yachting by Carol Nickle and Bryan Gooderham concluded, "the Beneteau First Class 10 will provide plenty of sailing excitement for those who enjoy the exhilaration of flat out performance. It exhibits a distinct French flair in both design and décor that provides a contrast to the mainstream of North American yachts." They did find much to criticize in the construction and materials used, however. On the choice of cabin interior materials, for instance, they stated, "we are a little dubious of the durability of this covering and its appearance after several years of hard racing." On the rigging, they stated, "rod rigging rather than stainless steel wire would be a useful addition on such a high-performance boat" and "we thought the cast-aluminum [boom] gooseneck fitting was of less than premier quality".

See also
List of sailing boat types

Similar sailboats
Beneteau 331
C&C 34
C&C 34/36
Catalina 34
Coast 34
Columbia 34
Columbia 34 Mark II
Creekmore 34
Crown 34
CS 34
Express 34
Hunter 34
San Juan 34
Sea Sprite 34
Sun Odyssey 349
Tartan 34 C
Tartan 34-2
Viking 34

References

External links

Keelboats
1980s sailboat type designs
Sailing yachts
Sailboat type designs by Groupe Finot
Sailboat type designs by Jacques Fauroux
Sailboat types built by Beneteau